Federico Ielapi (born 12 July 2010) is an Italian child actor. He received a special mention to the Guglielmo Biraghi Prize as part of the 2020 edition of the Nastro d'Argento Awards for the film Pinocchio, in which he played the title character.

Biography 
He made his debut in 2016 in the film Quo Vado? by Gennaro Nunziante, playing Checco Zalone as a child.

He then took part in the 2018 film The King's Musketeers, directed by Giovanni Veronesi, and in some television spots for Italo Treno, together with actor Francesco Pannofino. In 2018 he was also part of the main cast of season 11 of the TV series Don Matteo, playing Cosimo Farina.

In 2019 he played Pinocchio in the film of the same name directed by Matteo Garrone, receiving a special mention to the Guglielmo Biraghi Prize as part of the 2020 edition of the Nastro d'Argento Awards; Ielapi also dubbed himself in the English version of the film. In the same year he also took part to the film Brave ragazze, directed by Michela Andreozzi, playing the role of Francesco.

Filmography

Films

Television

Notes

External links

2010 births
Living people
Italian male film actors
Italian male television actors
Italian male child actors
21st-century Italian male actors